Derry Session House and Enclosure is a historic site located on the grounds of Derry Presbyterian Church at Derry Township, Dauphin County, Pennsylvania.  It consists of the log Session House, built about 1732, and a glass enclosure, erected in 1929. The hewn log Session House measures 18 feet by 13 feet and is one story high and was built for a Presbyterian session. The glass and steel enclosure measures approximately 24 feet by 19 feet, 6 inches, and sits on a reinforced concrete foundation.  The Enclosure, whose construction was originally funded by Milton S. Hershey, was refurbished in 1999.

It was added to the National Register of Historic Places in 2006.

References

External links
Derry Presbyterian Church website

Properties of religious function on the National Register of Historic Places in Pennsylvania
National Register of Historic Places in Dauphin County, Pennsylvania
Religious buildings and structures completed in 1732
Buildings and structures in Dauphin County, Pennsylvania
Buildings and structures completed in 1929